Nikola Dimitrov (born 20 November 1946) is a Bulgarian equestrian. He competed at the 1972 Summer Olympics and the 1980 Summer Olympics.

References

1946 births
Living people
Bulgarian male equestrians
Olympic equestrians of Bulgaria
Equestrians at the 1972 Summer Olympics
Equestrians at the 1980 Summer Olympics
People from Pazardzhik Province
20th-century Bulgarian people